Kim U-gil (born 17 October 1949) is a former boxer from North Korea who won the silver medal in the light flyweight division (– 48 kg) at the 1972 Summer Olympics in Munich, West Germany. In the final he was defeated by Hungary's György Gedó on points (5:0).

References

External links
 databaseOlympics

1949 births
Living people
Light-flyweight boxers
Olympic boxers of North Korea
Boxers at the 1972 Summer Olympics
Olympic silver medalists for North Korea
Olympic medalists in boxing
Medalists at the 1972 Summer Olympics
Asian Games medalists in boxing
Boxers at the 1974 Asian Games
North Korean male boxers
Asian Games bronze medalists for North Korea
Medalists at the 1974 Asian Games
20th-century North Korean people